Gulbarga Rural Assembly constituency is one of the 224 constituencies in the Karnataka Legislative Assembly of Karnataka a south state of India. Gulbarga Rural is also part of Gulbarga Lok Sabha constituency.

Members of Legislative Assembly
 2008: Revu Naik Belamgi, Bharatiya Janata Party
 2013: G. Ramkrishna, Indian National Congress
2018: Basawaraj Mattimud, Bharatiya Janata Party

See also
 Gulbarga
 List of constituencies of Karnataka Legislative Assembly

References

Assembly constituencies of Karnataka
Kalaburagi district